Polyhymno pleuracma is a moth of the family Gelechiidae. It was described by Edward Meyrick in 1926. It is found in KwaZulu-Natal, South Africa.

References

Endemic moths of South Africa
Moths described in 1926
Polyhymno